The Armed Forces of Gabon or the Gabonese Defense and Security Forces is the national professional military of the Republic of Gabon, divided into the Army, Air Force, Navy, and a National Gendarmerie, consisting of about 5,000 personnel. The armed forces includes a well-trained, well-equipped 1,800-member guard that provides security for the President of Gabon.

Organizational structure

Army

The Gabonese Army is the land component of the armed forces, specializing in infantry and mechanized reconnaissance. It was created on December 6, 1960 by decree of president Leon Mba from non-commissioned officers who served in the French colonial army, mainly the 2nd company of the 21st BIMA. Following independence, Gabon signed defense agreements with France, mainly on technical assistance and training. Until June 1964, the title of Chief of Staff of the Gabonese Armed Forces was held by a senior French Army officer. In 1962 a detachment of the Auxiliary Women of the Gabonese Armed Forces (AFFAG), commanded by Lieutenant Ba Oumar at the military camp of Owendo, was created. President Mba promoted the initiative following a visit to Tel Aviv, Israel, where he met female staff in its Defense Forces.

Order of battle
 Republican Guard Battalion (Libreville)
 1 Light Armoured recon unit
 3 Infantry companies 
 1 Artillery battery
 1 Air Defence battery
 Airborne Regiment
 1 Command company
 1 Recon & Support company
 3 Airborne companies
 1 Light Armoured Recon Battalion
 2 Armoured squads
 1 Command & Logistics company
 Support Command Regiment
 1 Artillery battery
 1 Mortar battery
 1 MRLS battery (8 Teruel MRL)
 1 Engineer company
 Logistic units
 7 Military Regions
 7 Motorised infantry battalions (1 battalion for each region)

Air Force

Order of battle
 Fighter Squadron 1-02 Leyou at BA02 Franceville with:
 Mirage F-1AZ
 MB-326M Impala I
 Heavy Transport Squadron at BA01 Libreville with:
 C-130 Hercules
 CN-235
 Ministerial Air Liaison Group ( or GLAM) at BA01 Libreville with:
 1 Falcon-900EX
 1 Gulfstream-III

Facilities
 BA01 Libreville
 BA02 Franceville
 Tchibanga

Navy

The Gabonese Navy is the official maritime branch of the armed forces. It was created in December 1960 as part of the army, and only became an independent entity in 1983. The navy's core purpose is to monitor the country's coastal waters, including 800 km of coastline.

 Headquarters Staff (Libreville)
 Port-Gentil Naval Base
 Mayumba Naval Base
 Port-Gentil Aviation Base
 Marine Rifle Battalion (since 1984)

Other security forces

National Gendarmerie
The National Gendarmerie of Gabon (Gendarmerie nationale gabonaise) is the national police force of Gabon responsible for law enforcement in the country. It was formed on March 10, 1960 when Gabon, formerly French Equatorial Africa, gained its independence from France. It originated from Libreville Gendarmerie Detachment 1929, which was commanded by Governor General of French Equatorial Africa, Félix Eboue. The main tasks of the gendarmerie are to defend the country's borders, ensure public safety, and to enforce actions taken by judicial and government authorities. The National Gendarmerie is under the direct command of the President of Gabon.

Republican Guard
The Gendarmerie is also in charge of the Republican Guard. It is viewed as the most powerful and sophisticated of the security forces. It is primarily tasked with protecting the president and ensures regime stability.

Equipment

Small arms

Armour

Artillery

Air defense

Current inventory

Retired aircraft 
Previous aircraft operated by the Air Force consisted of the  CM.170 Magister, C-130H Hercules,  Embraer EMB 110,  Fokker F28, Aérospatiale N 262, Reims C.337, and the Alouette II helicopter.

Naval Equipment

Ceremonial traditions 
 In April 2001, then-Defense Minister Bongo visited China, during which he reviewed the PLA honor guard upon arrival, and proposed to his Chinese counterpart Chi Haotian that members of the battalion will go to Gabon to help set up and train professional ceremonial units in the Gabonese military. In March 2003, after just under three years, the Chinese Ministry of National Defense sent four officers led by Lieutenant Colonel Wang Yuanjing to Libreville by the end of November of that year, after which they stayed to train the Gabonese guard of honour for more than six months.
The Principal Music Band of the Gabonese Defense Forces was created in 2010. It brings together elements of the Band of the National Gendarmerie, the Armed Forces and the Prytanée militaire de Libreville. It has a staff of 50 professional currently directed by Captain Jean-Baptiste Rabimbinongo. Its conductor, Lieutenant Léa Nzoufa Nze, was the first woman to conduct a military band to the Saumur International Festival of Military Bands. It takes part in many official ceremonies such as National Flag Day and the military parade marking the country's independence.

References 

Government of Gabon
Military of Gabon